Oliver Urso (born 29 April 1999) is a Danish football player who plays as a midfielder for Italian  club Novara.

Career
Urso started playing football in BK Søllerød-Vedbæk and later joined FC Copenhagen still as a youth player. Urso then traveled to Italy with his Danish mom and Italian father when he was nine and settled in Rome, where he later joined AS Roma. He played for AS Roma for a few years and later one year at Gsd Nuova Tor Tre Teste, but chose to take the plunge and travel north to Cesena - without the family - after AC Cesena had shown interest in him. After a year alone in the small town on the Adriatic, he was joined by both his brother and parents who moved north to support him. 

On 2 August 2018, Urso joined Salernitana, before he was loaned out to Pro Piacenza at the end of the same month that he joined Salernitana. Urso was at Piacenza until the end of 2018 and returned Salernitana, where his contract was terminated a day later.

On 13 April 2019, he joined Forlì.

On 12 July 2019, he signed with Rimini. On 2 September 2019, before he played any official games for Rimini, he was sold to another Serie C club, Viterbese.

On 23 July 2022, Urso moved to Novara on a two-year contract.

References

1999 births
Living people
Footballers from Copenhagen
Danish people of Italian descent
Danish men's footballers
Association football midfielders
Serie C players
Serie D players
U.S. Salernitana 1919 players
A.S. Pro Piacenza 1919 players
Forlì F.C. players
Rimini F.C. 1912 players
U.S. Viterbese 1908 players
Novara F.C. players
Danish expatriate men's footballers
Danish expatriate sportspeople in Italy
Expatriate footballers in Italy